Lost Trails of the Transvaal is a history book written by TV Bulpin and published in 1956.

The book was published by Howard Timmins and features line illustrations by A.A. Telford, and is 336 pages long.

1956 non-fiction books
History books about South Africa
South African non-fiction books